Brewton is a city in and 
the county seat of Escambia County, Alabama. As of the 2020 census, the population was 5,276. Brewton is located in south central Alabama, just north of the Florida Panhandle.

Brewton was home to the Downing Industrial School, a school for girls. Brewton was ranked as one of the 100 best small towns in America in Norman Crampton's book, The 100 Best Small Towns in America (1995).

History

The settlement at this site was originally known as Newport; barges made runs to and from Pensacola, Florida on Murder Creek and Burnt Corn Creek, before the railroad was constructed. In May 1861, Brewton was established as a train stop by Edmund Troupe Bruton. The area's lumber began to be harvested by industrialists.

During the Civil War, rail lines were severed, and small lumber mills were damaged or destroyed. After the war, the people rebuilt the Brewton economy, began a school, and established small businesses. Into the 1870s a new European demand for lumber stimulated the founding of numerous timber and lumber operations. The Conecuh-Escambia river system became a timber artery to ports on the Gulf of Mexico.

Brewton was established as a town on February 13, 1885. The state legislature designated the town as the seat of Escambia County, Alabama.

Brewton was known in past times as "the richest little town in the South." Brewton's high per capita income was based on the profits enjoyed by a small number of "timber barons." They had come at the end of the 19th century to harvest the pine forests. With their profits, they had extraordinary homes built along Belleville and Evergreen avenues. Such families include the McMillans, Lovelace and the Millers, many of whose descendants still reside in the town.

Over time the county erected a series of courthouses. Brewton developed an education system that included public and private institutions, including T. R. Miller High School. It was named for Thomas Richard Miller, a local timber baron and town father who donated money toward the building and opening of the school. Jefferson Davis Community College was established here in 1964; it has been renamed as Coastal Alabama Community College Brewton.

Geography
Brewton is located at  (31.117706, -87.071164).

Climate
Climate is characterized by relatively high temperatures and evenly distributed precipitation throughout the year. The Köppen Climate Classification sub-type for this climate is "Cfa" (Humid Subtropical Climate).

Demographics

Brewton first appeared on the 1870 U.S. Census as a Beat (Precinct) 5 of Escambia County. It appeared as Beat (Precinct) 3 in 1880. The population listed here for 1870-80 was the entire precinct, also including the area outside the town. Beginning with the 1890 U.S. Census, it appeared separately as an incorporated town.

2020 census

As of the 2020 U.S. census, there were 5,276 people, 2,050 households, and 1,249 families residing in the city.

2010 census
As of the 2010 census there were 5,408 people, 2,171 households, and 1,412 families residing in the city. The racial makeup of the city was 54.1% White or Caucasian, 42.6% Black or African American, 0.7% Native American, 0.4% Asian, 1.1% from other races, and 1.0% from two or more races. 2.2% of the population were Hispanic or Latino of any race.

There were 2,171 households, out of which 25.6% had children under the age of 18 living with them, 41.1% were married couples living together, 19.6% had a female householder with no husband present, and 35.0% were non-families. 32.0% of all households were made up of individuals, and 16.3% had someone living alone who was 65 years of age or older. The average household size was 2.36 and the average family size was 2.97.

In the city, the population was spread out, with 22.7% under the age of 18, 7.8% from 18 to 24, 22.4% from 25 to 44, 27.9% from 45 to 64, and 19.2% who were 65 years of age or older. The median age was 42.4 years. For every 100 females, there were 86.2 males. For every 100 females age 18 and over, there were 96.8 males.

The median income for a household in the city was $34,390, and the median income for a family was $49,554. Males had a median income of $35,233 versus $28,879 for females. The per capita income for the city was $20,467. About 19.6% of families and 22.3% of the population were below the poverty line, including 41.3% of those under age 18 and 7.9% of those age 65 or over.

Former Town of Alco (c1885/1888-1897)

Within Brewton is the former incorporated town of Alco. It existed from the mid-to-late 1880s (exact incorporation date uncertain) until it was dissolved as a town in 1897. The name was derived from the Alabama Lumber Company. It was located just southwest of Brewton & the junction of Burnt Corn & Murder Creeks . The name of the town still lives on today on the names of the churches (Alco Baptist Church & Alco United Methodist Church) and Alco Road. Pilgrim's Rest Cemetery, one of the oldest in Escambia County, is located across from the United Methodist Church and mentions Alco on its historic marker. Alco was annexed into Brewton on June 31, 1945.

Historic Demographics

Government
The city government consists of a part-time mayor elected at-large and a five-member part-time city council elected from districts.  Brewton utilizes a city school system.

Culture and special events

The annual Alabama Blueberry Festival is held at Jennings Park and downtown Brewton. Prior to 2006 it was held on the campus of Jefferson Davis Community College.

The Thomas E. McMillan Museum is housed on the campus of the Jefferson Davis Community College. It was founded in 1979 to chronicle life in Escambia County, Alabama. The museum includes items from 10,000-year-old fossils, to a fireside popcorn popper and a display of cameras.

Notable people
 Sharon Lovelace Blackburn, the first female federal judge appointed in Alabama
 Johnnie Byrd, former member of the Florida House of Representatives
 Grayson Capps, singer-songwriter
 Catherine Crosby, Miss Alabama 2003
 Kristi DuBose, judge on the United States District Court for the Southern District of Alabama
 Wayne Frazier, pro football player, former Auburn University player
 William Lee Golden, member of The Oak Ridge Boys
 Deanna Jackson, professional women's basketball player
 Teddy Keaton, football coach, Stillman College
 Cliff Lewis, former professional football player
 Hank Locklin, country music singer
 Jonathan Bell Lovelace, founder of Capital Group Companies
 Edwin L. Nelson, former judge on the United States District Court for the Northern District of Alabama
 Anthony Redmon, former NFL offensive lineman
 William W. Seay, soldier during the Vietnam War, recipient of the Medal of Honor
 Fred Snowden, former men's basketball coach for the University of Arizona
 Kevin Sumlin, football coach, University of Arizona football
 Davern Williams, former defensive tackle for the Miami Dolphins and New York Giants
 Edward O. Wilson, two-time Pulitzer prize winner and biologist

Historic sites

Brewton has one site listed on the National Register of Historic Places, the Brewton Historic Commercial District.

The historic Second Saint Siloam Missionary Baptist Church was established on November 5, 1909 when a group of worshipers gathered at the Congregational Church on the corner of St. Joseph and Evergreen avenues in Brewton to organize a new church. The Second St. Siloam Missionary Baptist Church was dedicated on June 10, 1910 on the corner of East and North streets. On April 1, 2010 the church was added to the Alabama Register of Historic Places.

References

Notes

References

External links

City of Brewton website
Brewton Chamber of Commerce website

Cities in Alabama
Cities in Escambia County, Alabama
County seats in Alabama